Baghak Rural District is in the Central District of Tangestan County, Bushehr province, Iran. At the census of 2006, its population was 12,087 in 2,803 households; there were 12,637 inhabitants in 3,363 households at the following census of 2011; and in the most recent census of 2016, the population of the rural district was 12,483 in 3,653 households. The largest of its 36 villages was Boneh Gaz, with 3,254 people.

References 

Rural Districts of Bushehr Province
Populated places in Tangestan County